Gravity's Rainbow is a 1973 novel by Thomas Pynchon.

Gravity's Rainbow may also refer to:

 Gravity's Rainbow (album), a 1993 album by Pat Benatar
 "Gravity's Rainbow" (song), a 2006 song by Klaxons
 Rainbow gravity theory or "gravity's rainbow", a physics theory